"Got to Be Real" is a song by American singer Cheryl Lynn from her 1978 self-titled debut studio album. The song, which was Lynn's debut single, was written by Lynn, David Paich and David Foster.

Recording
For the recording, David Shields played bass, David Paich played keyboards, James Gadson played drums and Ray Parker Jr. was the session guitarist.

Chart performance
In the United States, "Got to Be Real" hit number 12 on the Billboard Hot 100 and hit number one on the Hot Soul Singles chart in early 1979. Along with the album tracks "Star Love" and "You Saved My Day", "Got to Be Real" peaked at number eleven on the National Disco Action Top 40 chart. In the UK the song did not chart upon its original release - in 2010 it was used for a TV advertising campaign for Marks & Spencer, a department store, and it entered the main charts for the first time at number 78 for the week ending April 4, the next week peaking at number 70.

Track listing and formats
 US 7-inch vinyl single
 "Got to Be Real" – 3:42
 "Come in from the Rain" – 3:35

 US 12-inch vinyl single
 "Got to Be Real" – 5:10
 "Come in from the Rain" – 3:35

Charts and certifications

Weekly charts

Year-end charts

Certifications and sales

Erik version

In 1993, British singer Erik released a cover of "Got to Be Real", produced by Pete Waterman and Dave Ford. To date, it is her most well-known song, resulting in a UK club smash hit and peaking at number 42 on the UK Singles Chart.

Critical reception
Pan-European magazine Music & Media commented, "It's the second time around for this pop/dance ditty from the late 70’s. With three mixes to chose from, hit potential is greatly enhanced." Andy Beevers from Music Week gave the song four out of five. He wrote, "Erik has taken Cheryl Lynn's late Seventies dancefloor anthem and interpreted it in a bang up-to-date disco house style. The result has been solid club support and its abundance of catchy hooks should earn some radio plays."

Track listing
 7", UK (1993)
"Got to Be Real"	
"I Can't Take Any More"

 12", UK (1993)
"Got to Be Real" (Silver City Mix)	
"Got to Be Real" (Hot Tip 12)	
"Got to Be Real" (TK Groove)	
"Got to Be Real" (J & S Disco Bunny)

 CD single, UK (1994)
"Got to Be Real" (Hot Tip 7)4:12
"Got to Be Real" (TK Groove)7:24
"Got to Be Real" (J&S Disco Bunny)7:24
"I Can't Take Any More"	3:51

Charts

Mary J. Blige and Will Smith version

Shark Tale: Motion Picture Soundtrack was released on September 21, 2004 as the soundtrack of Shark Tale. The soundtrack features newly recorded music by various artists, including Christina Aguilera, Sean Paul,  Timbaland, The Pussycat Dolls, Ludacris, Missy Elliott, and Justin Timberlake. As part of the album, "Got to Be Real" was covered by Mary J. Blige and Will Smith.

Legacy
"Got to Be Real" was inducted into the Dance Music Hall of Fame on September 19, 2005. RIAA Platinum Certification. In 2017, ShortList's Dave Fawbert listed the song as containing "one of the greatest key changes in music history".

Cheryl Lynn's recording of “Got to Be Real” was used on the soundtrack of Paris Is Burning in 1990, and has been noted as reinforcing themes of the documentary film; New York-based DJ Prince Language commented to NPR in 1992 that  "The music that animates the movements of the dancers in the film, especially the lyrics, provides a subversive and sometimes even shady commentary on the politics and aesthetics of drag and ball culture. The use of Cheryl Lynn's 'Got To Be Real' is the ultimate example of this, brilliantly touching on drag's invocations of and insistence on 'realness,' and the film shows how balls and dancers ultimately question the very notion of what is 'real' in the context of identity, and how we each create and construct our own 'real' selves."

"Got to Be Real" was sampled in Father MC's 1990 rap hit "I'll Do 4 U".

The song was featured in Brian De Palma's 1993 crime drama film Carlito’s Way.

The song was featured in the South Park nineteenth season episode "Safe Space", where actor Steven Seagal dances along during a presentation at South Park Elementary School.

This song is featured on a Chilean insurance company ING between 2005 and 2011.

The track was used in Season 4 at the end of Episode 2 "The Real Me" of the series Sex and the City in the scenes featuring Carrie as a specially invited celeb in a charity runway show.

See also
 Soul number-one singles of 1979 (US)
 List of 1970s one-hit wonders in the United States

References

External links
 [ Allmusic Entry]
 

1978 debut singles
Cheryl Lynn songs
Songs written by David Foster
Songs written by David Paich
1978 songs
Columbia Records singles
Mary J. Blige songs
Will Smith songs